is a stony Vestian asteroid and an exceptionally slow rotating body from the inner regions of the asteroid belt, approximately 3 kilometers in diameter. It was discovered on 10 December 1999, by LINEAR at Lincoln Laboratory's Experimental Test Site in Socorro, New Mexico, United States.

Classification and orbit 

The body is classified as a S-type member of the Vesta family by the Collaborative Asteroid Lightcurve Link Light Curve Data Base (LCDB) . It orbits the Sun at a distance of 2.2–2.5 AU once every 3 years and 8 months (1,328 days). Its orbit has an eccentricity of 0.08 and an inclination of 6° with respect to the ecliptic. A first precovery was obtained at the discovering observatory in October 1999, extending the asteroid's observation arc by 2 months prior to its official discovery observation.

Physical characteristics 

A rotational lightcurve was obtained for this asteroid from photometric observations at the Californian Palomar Transient Factory in September 2013. It gave a rotation period of 1234 hours with an estimated error margin of ±90 hours. , it is the 6th slowest rotating minor planet known to exist. Its high brightness variation of 0.69 magnitude indicates that it has a non-spheroidal shape.

According to the LCDB, the body's surface has an assumed standard albedo for stony asteroids of 0.20 and a calculated diameter of 2.96 kilometers with an absolute magnitude of 15.01.

Numbering and naming 

This minor planet was numbered by the Minor Planet Center on 15 April 2004. As of 2018, it has not been named.

References

External links 
 Asteroid Lightcurve Database (LCDB), query form (info )
 Dictionary of Minor Planet Names, Google books
 Asteroids and comets rotation curves, CdR – Observatoire de Genève, Raoul Behrend
 Discovery Circumstances: Numbered Minor Planets (75001)-(80000) – Minor Planet Center
 
 

Vesta asteroids
Discoveries by LINEAR
Slow rotating minor planets
19991210